Toftøya or Toftarøyna is an island in Øygarden Municipality in Vestland county, Norway.

Geography 
The  island lies just south of the large island of Sotra, along the northern side of the Korsfjorden.

The island is connected to Sotra by a bridge on County Road 200.  The island has 3 main village areas:  Hummelsund (on the south side), Vikso (on the southwest side), and Tofta (on the west side).

See also
List of islands of Norway

References

Islands of Vestland
Øygarden